The Scheuchzerhorn is a mountain of the Bernese Alps, located west of the Grimsel Pass in the canton of Bern. It lies north-east of the Oberaarhorn, on the range separating the valley of the Unteraar Glacier from the valley of the Oberaar Glacier.

The mountain was named in honor of the Swiss naturalist Johann Jakob Scheuchzer.

See also
List of mountains of Switzerland named after people

References

External links
 Scheuchzerhorn on Hikr

Mountains of the Alps
Alpine three-thousanders
Mountains of Switzerland
Mountains of the canton of Bern